Sheila Scribner (June 4, 1984 – November 25, 2021) is an American singer, songwriter, and voice-over artist.

Early life
Fusion singer Sheila Scribner was born in Nashville, Tennessee. At age three she was sent to live with her grandparents in Illinois. After a tumultuous period, music provided stability and her family encouraged her to join a choir. By fifteen she was singing lead vocals in a rock band, Paradigm Shift.

Early projects
In 2002 Scribner began focusing more on her art and participated in a series of artshows with the guidance of a mentor. While still in school she got her first voiceover work. The following months were interrupted by a car accident and the news of her grandfather's cancer. Hoping to avoiding a depression relapse, Scribner went to Lebanon and Egypt and began to write. On her return she recorded the single "Ma'salama" ("goodbye" in Arabic) and held two final artshows, after deciding to concentrate strictly on music. Scribner then moved to Chicago with the hope of collaborating with local musicians.

Band and solo projects
During 2004–2006 Scribner sang lead vocals in the jazz rock fusion band "Reason Why" and occasionally worked with djs. Although singing house provided stability Scribner became distraught that her own compositions were not being heard. In 2008 she traveled to Cairo and worked with local DJs. She got married and initially thought to be temporary, Scribner eventually moved to Egypt and stayed through the Revolution.

With musicians she has performed concerts at the Cairo Opera House and Cairo Jazz Club. During a time she worked and wrote with Soopar Lox, and separated in July 2011.

Currently Scribner is working on her solo project. The music incorporates ethnic instruments and arrangements but retains her clear yet soulful vocal style. Although ranging in the umbrella of pop, much of the lyrics discuss her battle with eating disorders and hint at a private suffering. "In the Night"  among others has been recorded and mixed at Wave Music House in Cairo, Egypt.

Scribner also participated in a movie soundtrack, Al Watar, which was released in 2011.

Discography

DVD
 2011: Al Watar

References

External links

 

Living people
1984 births
Singers from Chicago
American people of Lebanese descent
21st-century American singers
Singer-songwriters from Illinois